The  is an interurban railway line in Japan operated by the private railway operator Keihan Electric Railway. The 7.5 km line connects Misasagi Station in Kyoto and Biwako-Hamaōtsu Station in the neighbouring city of Ōtsu.

Train service
Except trains between Shinomiya Station and Hamaōtsu Station in early morning and late night, all trains go directly from Hamaōtsu Station to Kyoto Shiyakusho-mae Station or Uzumasa Tenjingawa Station on the Kyoto Subway Tōzai Line.
During off peak hours, the line operates every 15 minutes.

Stations and connecting lines

Abandoned stations
Midorigaoka Undōjō-mae: Shinomiya - Oiwake (extra station, abandoned in 1942)
Kamisekidera: Ōtani - Kamisakaemachi (abandoned on August 15, 1971)
Fudanotsuji: Kamisakaemachi - Biwako-Hamaōtsu (abandoned on October 1, 1946)

Abandoned section
The station list is as of 1997 before the street running section was abandoned due to replacement by the Tōzai Line subway. It also lists the corresponding subway stations that replaced the Keishin Line stations.

Rolling stock
 Keihan 800 series, four-car EMUs

History
The line was built in 1912 (dual track electrified at 600 V DC) to connect the city centers of Kyoto and Ōtsu by electric streetcars, as the steam-powered Tōkaidō Main Line was an indirect route between the two cities before its realignment in 1921.

The busiest section of the line, between Keishin-Sanjō Station and Misasagi Station, was replaced in 1997 by the Kyoto Subway Tōzai Line, and the voltage increased to 1,500 V DC in conjunction with this project. One of the aims of the realignment was to move the tracks underground in the Kyoto area, in order to remove the former alignment along public roads. The line retains its public road alignment in Ōtsu.

References
This article incorporates material from the corresponding article in the Japanese Wikipedia.

Keishin Line
Ōtsu
Rail transport in Shiga Prefecture
Rail transport in Kyoto Prefecture
Standard gauge railways in Japan
Railway lines opened in 1912
1912 establishments in Japan
1500 V DC railway electrification